Karin Märta Elisabeth Enström (born Landerholm 23 March 1966) is a Swedish politician of the  Moderate Party. She has served as Secretary-General of the Moderate Party since October 2022 and has been Member of the Riksdag since the 1998 general election, representing Stockholm County. She served as Minister for Defence in the cabinet of Fredrik Reinfeldt from 2012 to 2014. She is an Amphibious Corps officer by profession.

Political career
Enström has been a member of the Riksdag since 1998, representing Stockholm County. She was a member of the Defense Committee from 2002 to 2010, serving as its Chairman from 2008. After the 2010 general election she was appointed as Chairman of the Committee on Foreign Affairs and was also a member of the War Delegation and the Foreign Policy Council. Enström was commissioned as an officer in 1987, passed the Royal War College (Kungliga Krigshögskolan) common course in 1988, and its higher course in 1993. She currently holds the rank of captain in the Swedish Amphibious Corps. She has been a member of the City Council of Vaxholm since 1994 and was chairman of the council from 2002 to 2006.

Other activities
 European Council on Foreign Relations (ECFR), Member of the Council

Personal life 
Enström is the daughter of surgeon general Staffan Landerholm and Olena (born Tingdahl). Her older brother, Henrik Landerholm, is Sweden's Ambassador to Riga since 1 September 2013. Her sister, Louise Landerholm Bill, is married to Per Bill.

She is married to Anders Enström, a lieutenant colonel in the Amphibious Corps employed at the Navy Tactical Staff Headquarters. She has three children.

References

External links 
Karin Enström at the Riksdag website
 

1966 births
21st-century Swedish women politicians
Female defence ministers
Living people
Members of the Riksdag 1998–2002
Members of the Riksdag 2002–2006
Members of the Riksdag 2006–2010
Members of the Riksdag 2010–2014
Members of the Riksdag 2018–2022
Members of the Riksdag 2014–2018
Members of the Riksdag 2022–2026
Members of the Riksdag from the Moderate Party
People from Uppsala
Swedish Ministers for Defence
Swedish Navy officers
Women members of the Riksdag
Women government ministers of Sweden